Triptilodiscus is a genus of flowering plants in the tribe Gnaphalieae within the family Asteraceae.

Species
The only known species is  Triptilodiscus pygmaeus, called the common sunray. It is native to Australia, found in all six states plus the Northern Territory.

References

External links
Tasmanian Threatened Species Listing Statement, dwarf sunray, Triptilodiscus pygmaeus 

Gnaphalieae
Monotypic Asteraceae genera
Endemic flora of Australia
Taxa named by Nikolai Turczaninow